The Islamic Solidarity Games are a regional multi-sport event held between nations from the Muslim world. A men's football tournament has been held at every session of the Games since the first edition in 2005.

Summaries
The following table gives an overview of medal winners in football at the Islamic Solidarity Games.

Medal table

Participating nations

Legend
 – Champions
 – Runners-up
 – Third place
4th – Fourth place
GS – Group stage
q – Qualified
 — Hosts

External links
2005 Islamic Solidarity Games Overview - rsssf.com

 
Islamic Solidarity Games